St. Leon or Saint Leon is the anglicization of Saint Léon, the French form of the name of Saint Leo.  It may refer to:

Places

Canada
St. Leon, British Columbia, also known as St. Leon Hot Springs, an unincorporated settlement and former hot springs resort in the Kootenay region of British Columbia, Canada

Mount St. Leon, a mountain of the Selkirk Mountains, in the vicinity of St. Leon, British Columbia
St. Leon, Manitoba

United States
St. Leon, Indiana

Books
St. Leon (novel) (1799), eighteenth-century British philosopher William Godwin's second novel
St. Leon: A Drama. In Three Acts (1835), a play by John Hobart Caunter inspired by Godwin's novel

See also 
 Saint Leonard (disambiguation)
 Saint Leo (disambiguation)
 San Leon (disambiguation) (in Spanish)
 San Leone (disambiguation) (in Italian)
 Saint-Léon (disambiguation) (in French)